Latasha Harris (born April 3, 1988) is an American professional wrestler currently signed to Impact Wrestling under the ring name Tasha Steelz. She is a former Knockouts World Champion and a former two-time Knockouts Tag Team Champion. She also worked in National Wrestling Alliance (NWA) and Ring of Honor (ROH).

Professional wrestling career

Ring of Honor (2017–2020) 
Steelz made her Ring of Honor (ROH) debut on April 1, 2017, at the Supercard of Honor XI pre-show, where she defeated Brandi Lauren. On the September 15, 2018 episode of ROH TV Steelz unsuccessfully challenged the Women of Honor World Champion Sumie Sakai in a non-title Proving Ground match. On the July 12, 2019 episode of ROH TV, after defeating Angelina Love, Jenny Rose and Stella Grey, Steelz became the No. 1 contender for the Women of Honor World Championship which then was held by Kelly Klein. Steelz faced Klein for the championship on August 9, 2019 at Summer Supercard, where Klein retained the title. Steelz was booked to participant at the Quest for Gold tournament for the new Ring of Honor Women's World Championship, which was supposed to take place on April 24, 2020. However, the show was cancelled due to the COVID-19 pandemic. Steelz would later sign with Impact Wrestling.

National Wrestling Alliance (2019–2020) 
Steelz made her National Wrestling Alliance (NWA) debut on December 14, 2019, at Into the Fire, where she unsuccessfully challenged Thunder Rosa. After having a couple of matches against Marti Belle and Melina, Steelz made her final televised appearance on the May 12, 2020 episode of NWA Power, where she defeated Ashley Vox and Belle.

Impact Wrestling (2020–present) 
Steelz made her Impact Wrestling debut on the May 17, 2019 episode of Impact!, where she competed in a Knockouts battle royal, which was won by Glenn Gilbertti. Steelz made her return to the company on the May 12, 2020 episode of Impact!, where she unsuccessfully challenged Kylie Rae. On May 13, Impact Wrestling announced that Steelz has signed with company.

With Steelz arriving to Impact Wrestling, she quickly formed an alliance with Kiera Hogan, establishing themselves as the villainous duo of the Knockouts division. On the June 2 episode of Impact!, Steelz won her first match on Impact, as she teamed with Hogan where they defeated the team of Rae and Susie. Hogan and Steelz, now known as Fire 'N Flava, found themselves feuding with Havok and Neveah, which led into a no disqualification match on the August 11 episode of Impact!, where Hogan and Steelz were victorious, ending their feud with Havok and Nevaeh in the process. On January 16, 2021, at Hard to Kill, Hogan and Steelz defeated Havok and Nevaeh to become the new Impact Knockouts Tag Team Champions. On April 25 at Rebellion, they lost the titles to Jordynne Grace and Rachael Ellering, ending their reign at 99 days. On May 15, at Under Siege, Hogan and Steelz won them back to become two-time champions. On the Slammiversary pre-show, they lost the titles to Decay (Havok and Rosemary). On the August 5 episode of Impact!, Savannah Evans attacked Hogan as Steelz only watched, thus disbanding Fire 'N Flava.

On July 31 at Homecoming, Steelz teamed with Fallah Bahh to compete in a tournament to crown a Homecoming King and Queen, but were defeated by Decay (Crazzy Steve and Rosemary) in the first round. At Emergence, she teamed with Bahh, No Way, and Savannah Evans for an eight-person tag match, losing to Decay (Steve, Rosemary, Havok, and Black Taurus). In October, Steelz competed in the Knockouts Knockdown tournament, to determine who will get a future shot at the Impact Knockouts Championship, defeating Jamie Senegal in the quarterfinals, Chelsea Green in the semifinals, but lost to Mercedes Martinez in the final. At Bound for Glory, she participated in the Call Your Shot Gauntlet match, where the winner could choose any championship match of their choice, eliminating Rachael Ellering but was eliminated by Melina.

On January 8, 2022, at Hard to Kill, Steelz won the inaugural Knockouts Ultimate X match to become the number one contender for the Impact Knockouts World Championship. On February 19 at No Surrender, she went up against Mickie James for the title in a losing effort. On the March 3 episode of Impact!, Steelz defeated Chelsea Green to get another shot at the title. Two days later, at Sacrifice, she defeated James to win the Impact Knockouts World Championship for the first time. On the March 24 episode of Impact!, Steelz made her first successful title defense against James in a Street Fight. At Multiverse of Matches, she teamed with Savannah Evans in a four-way tag team match for the Impact Knockouts World Tag Team Championship, which was won by The Influence (Madison Rayne and Tenille Dashwood). Steelz then retained her title against Decay, beating Rosemary at Rebellion, and Havok at Under Siege. On June 19 at Slammiversary, she lost the title to Jordynne Grace in the inaugural Queen of the Mountain match, ending her reign at 106 days. On July 1 at Against All Odds, Steelz failed to recapture the title from Grace in a rematch.

On the August 4 episode of Impact!, Steelz started a feud with the debuting Killer Kelly, commentating a match between two local talents that the latter took out afterwards. The following weeks saw Steelz and Savannah Evans getting attacked by Kelly. On September 23, at the Countdown to Victory Road pre-show, Steelz defeated Kelly by disqualification. At Bound for Glory, Steelz competed in the Call Your Shot Gauntlet, eliminating Evans and Kelly but was eliminated by eventual winner Bully Ray. The following night (which aired on tape delay on October 13), she lost to Kelly in a no disqualification match. On November 18, at Over Drive, Steelz teamed with Evans and fought The Death Dollz (Jessicka and Taya Valkyrie) for the Impact Knockouts World Tag Team Championship, but failed to win.

Championships and accomplishments 
 Battle Club Pro
 BCP ICONS Championship (2 times)
 Chaotic Wrestling
 Chaotic Wrestling Women's Championship (2 times)
Impact Wrestling
Impact Knockouts World Championship (1 time)
Impact Knockouts Tag Team Championship (2 times) – with Kiera Hogan
Impact Knockouts Tag Team Championship Tournament  (2020-21) – with Kiera Hogan
 Independent Wrestling Federation
 IWF Women's Championship (1 time)	Pennsylvania Premiere WrestlingPPW Women's Championship (1 time, current)
 Pro Wrestling Illustrated Ranked No. 11 of the top 150 female wrestlers in the PWI Women's 150 in 2022
 Synergy Pro Wrestling'''
 Women's Garden State Invitational (2020)

Personal life
Harris is of Puerto Rican descent.

References

External links 

Tasha Steelz's Impact Wrestling profile

1987 births
Living people
People from Bloomfield, New Jersey
Professional wrestlers from New Jersey
American female professional wrestlers
American sportspeople of Puerto Rican descent
21st-century African-American sportspeople
African-American female professional wrestlers
20th-century African-American people
20th-century African-American women
21st-century African-American women
21st-century professional wrestlers
TNA/Impact Knockouts World Champions
TNA/Impact Knockouts World Tag Team Champions